Thrust-specific fuel consumption (TSFC) is the fuel efficiency of an engine design with respect to thrust output. TSFC may also be thought of as fuel consumption (grams/second) per unit of thrust (newtons, or N), hence thrust-specific. This figure is inversely proportional to specific impulse, which is the amount of thrust produced per unit fuel consumed.

TSFC or SFC for thrust engines (e.g. turbojets, turbofans, ramjets, rockets, etc.) is the mass of fuel needed to provide the net thrust for a given period e.g. lb/(h·lbf) (pounds of fuel per hour-pound of thrust) or g/(s·kN) (grams of fuel per second-kilonewton). Mass of fuel is used, rather than volume (gallons or litres) for the fuel measure, since it is independent of temperature.

Specific fuel consumption of air-breathing jet engines at their maximum efficiency is more or less proportional to exhaust speed. The fuel consumption per mile or per kilometre is a more appropriate comparison for aircraft that travel at very different speeds. There also exists power-specific fuel consumption, which equals the thrust-specific fuel consumption divided by speed. It can have units of pounds per hour per horsepower.

Significance of SFC
SFC is dependent on engine design, but differences in the SFC between different engines using the same underlying technology tend to be quite small. Increasing overall pressure ratio on jet engines tends to decrease SFC.

In practical applications, other factors are usually highly significant in determining the fuel efficiency of a particular engine design in that particular application. For instance, in aircraft, turbine (jet and turboprop) engines are typically much smaller and lighter than equivalently powerful piston engine designs, both properties reducing the levels of drag on the plane and reducing the amount of power needed to move the aircraft. Therefore, turbines are more efficient for aircraft propulsion than might be indicated by a simplistic look at the table below.

SFC varies with throttle setting, altitude, climate. For jet engines, air flight speed is an important factor too. 
Air flight speed counteracts the jet's exhaust speed. (In an artificial and extreme case with the aircraft flying exactly at the exhaust speed, one can easily imagine why the jet's net thrust should be near zero.)  Moreover, since work is force (i.e., thrust) times distance, mechanical power is force times speed. Thus, although the nominal SFC is a useful measure of fuel efficiency, it should be divided by speed when comparing engines at different speeds.

For example, Concorde cruised at 1354 mph, or 7.15 million feet per hour, with its engines giving an SFC of 1.195 lb/(lbf·h) (see below); this means the engines transferred 5.98 million foot pounds per pound of fuel (17.9 MJ/kg), equivalent to an SFC of 0.50 lb/(lbf·h) for a subsonic aircraft flying at 570 mph, which would be better than even modern engines; the Olympus 593 used in the Concorde was the world's most efficient jet engine. However, Concorde ultimately has a heavier airframe and, due to being supersonic, is less aerodynamically efficient, i.e., the lift to drag ratio is far lower. In general, the total fuel burn of a complete aircraft is of far more importance to the customer.

Units

Typical values of SFC for thrust engines

The following table gives the efficiency for several engines when running at 80% throttle, which is approximately what is used in cruising, giving a minimum SFC. The efficiency is the amount of power propelling the plane divided by the rate of energy consumption. Since the power equals thrust times speed, the efficiency is given by

where V is speed and h is the energy content per unit mass of fuel (the higher heating value is used here, and at higher speeds the kinetic energy of the fuel or propellant becomes substantial and must be included).

See also
Brake specific fuel consumption
Energies per unit mass
Specific impulse
Vehicle metrics

References

External links
GE CF6 website 
NASA Cruise SFC vs. Year
SFC by Engine/Mfg 

Engine technology
Power (physics)